Torrente 2: misión en Marbella is a 2001 Spanish dark comedy. The film is the sequel to Torrente, el brazo tonto de la ley, and, like the first film, it was written and directed by Santiago Segura who takes the leading role of José Luis Torrente. It surpassed its predecessor as the highest-grossing Spanish film of all time.

Plot
Torrente has moved to Marbella, where, after being wiped out of the money he had gained, he has returned to private investigation. But in one of his cases he gets involved in the middle of a villain's missile plot to destroy the city and his own uncle's blackmail operation... and he knows nothing.

Cast 
Santiago Segura as José Luis Torrente
Gabino Diego as Cuco
Tony Leblanc as Mauricio Torrente
José Luis Moreno as Spinelli
Inés Sastre as Bella cantante
Arturo Valls as Fabiano
Juanito Navarro as Alcalde de Marbella
Eloi Yebra as Gayolo
Rosanna Walls as Robertson
Carolina Bona as Lolita
Paloma Cela as Casera
José Luis López Vázquez as Guijarro
Manuel Barragán as himself
To note the participation of the tennis player Carlos Moya which makes an appearance as tennis coach

Production locations
Marbella
Madrid
Málaga
Yunquera de Henares

Reception
The film had the second highest-grossing weekend ever in Spain behind Star Wars: Episode I - The Phantom Menace and became Spain's highest-grossing film of all time with a gross of $21 million.

See also 
 List of Spanish films of 2001

References

External links 

2001 films
Films shot in Madrid
Spanish comedy films
2000s Spanish-language films
Madrid in fiction
Andalusia in fiction
Films scored by Roque Baños
Films directed by Santiago Segura
LolaFilms films
2000s Spanish films